Juan Carlos García Álvarez (born March 13, 1985, in Mexico City) is a Mexican football manager and former player. He is currently the manager of Las Vegas Legends.

References

External links
 

1985 births
Living people
Footballers from Mexico City
Association football defenders
Mexican footballers
Club Puebla players
Tecos F.C. footballers
C.F. Mérida footballers
Venados F.C. players
Las Vegas Lights FC players
Liga MX players
Mexican expatriate footballers
Expatriate soccer players in the United States
Mexican expatriate sportspeople in the United States